Tina Ann Mapes (born 21 January 1971) is an English football coach and former player, who represented the England women's national football team at senior international level. She played for England in the 1995 FIFA Women's World Cup finals.

Playing career

Club
Mapes played with Reigate in the Sussex Martlet League, then signed for Millwall Lionesses in the Greater London League. Winning club Player of the Year in her first season, 1989–90, Mapes was also part of the Millwall team which won the 1991 Women's FA Cup.

Millwall's squad broke up in the aftermath of that success and Mapes began 1991–92 with Wimbledon. Before the end of the season, the first with a National league structure in England, Mapes was scouted by Swedish second-level club Lindsdals IF. She joined the Swedes on a semi–pro basis, linking up with former Millwall teammate Karen Farley.

In 1994 Mapes was brought back to England by Croydon, whose player–manager Debbie Bampton was another member of Millwall's 1991 FA Cup winning team. Playing as a sweeper or central midfielder, Mapes helped her new club to a League and Cup double in 1996. Mapes converted her kick in the penalty shootout in the 1996 FA Women's Cup final win over Liverpool. In the following year's competition, Mapes missed as Croydon lost a semi–final shootout to Millwall.

In 1997 Mapes signed for champions Arsenal. In the 1997–98 FA Women's Cup Mapes took part in another semi–final shootout, this time as an emergency goalkeeper after Arsenal's Sarah Reed had been sent off. Arsenal edged out Bradford City and Mapes collected another winner's medal when Arsenal beat Croydon 3–2 in the final.
Mapes appeared in five and won FA cup finals.

National team
Mapes captained the Women's Football Association (WFA) England U–21 team. She made her senior debut before the Football Association (FA) took over women's football in 1993, but dropped out of contention while playing in Sweden.

Coaching career

Mapes also has an UEFA A Licence in coaching working with many local clubs, she also tutors for the FA delivering level 1&2 coaching courses.

Honours

Arsenal

FA Cup: 1998–99

References

1971 births
Living people
English women's footballers
England women's international footballers
Charlton Athletic W.F.C. players
Arsenal W.F.C. players
Millwall Lionesses L.F.C. players
FA Women's National League players
1995 FIFA Women's World Cup players
Expatriate footballers in Sweden
English expatriate women's footballers
Women's association football defenders
Women's association football midfielders